Delias edela is a butterfly in the family Pieridae. It was described by Hans Fruhstorfer in 1910. It is endemic to Obi Island, Indonesia. It is a very rare species. It is sometimes considered a subspecies of Delias poecilea.

The wingspan is about 70–75 mm.

References

External links
Delias at Markku Savela's Lepidoptera and Some Other Life Forms

edela
Butterflies described in 1910